Loes Haverkort (born 1981) is a Dutch actress. She has performed in movies, television shows and theaters.

Career 
Haverkort did her acting course at the Maastricht Academy of Dramatic Arts. She has performed in the musical Soldier of Orange and a play based on the 1987 movie Fatal Attraction. The adaptation and her performance were praised. She has been one of the presenters of the show .

She played the lead role in the movie , directed by Antoinette Beumer. She sang the title song of the movie. She has acted in the Dutch television series Bernhard, schavuit van Oranje.

She played the female lead in a Dutch comedy movie named Voor Elkaar Gemaakt, which is a remake of the German movie :de:Vaterfreuden.

In 2019, she played a role in the romantic comedy film Singel 39.

Personal life 
Loes Haverkort is married to pianist Floris Verbeij. She has one son and one daughter with her husband.

References

External links 

1981 births
Living people
Dutch film actresses
Dutch musical theatre actresses
Dutch stage actresses
Dutch television actresses
People from Almelo